The Betty Ford Story  is a 1987 television film directed by David Greene and written by Karen Hall. This biographical film was based on the book The Times of My Life written by Chris Chase and Betty Ford. The film originally aired on ABC.

Cast
Gena Rowlands as Betty Ford
Josef Sommer as President Gerald Ford
Nan Woods as Susan Ford
Bradley Whitford as Jack Ford
Concetta Tomei as Jan
John Hostetter" as News Director

Awards and nominations
Casting Society of America
Best Casting for TV Movie of the Week (nominated)

Emmy Awards
Outstanding Lead Actress in a Miniseries or a Special (Gena Rowlands, won) 
Outstanding Costuming for a Miniseries or a Special (nominated)

Golden Globe Awards
Best Actress in a Mini-Series or Motion Picture Made for TV (Gena Rowlands, won)

References

External links

1987 television films
1987 films
1987 drama films
1980s American films
1980s biographical drama films
1980s English-language films
ABC network original films
American biographical drama films
American drama television films
Biographical television films
Cultural depictions of Betty Ford
Cultural depictions of Gerald Ford
Films about addiction
Films about alcoholism
Films based on memoirs
Films directed by David Greene
Films scored by Arthur B. Rubinstein
Films set in 1974
Films set in 1976
Films set in 1978
Television films based on books
The Wolper Organization films
Warner Bros. films